The Evidence of Things Not Seen, a book-length essay by James Baldwin, covers the Atlanta murders of 1979–1981, often called the Atlanta Child Murders, and probes Atlanta's related social issues, especially race relations. Baldwin had ventured to Atlanta as a literary reporter on assignment by Playboy magazine, which by then had published a considerable catalog by black writers, such as Alex Haley and James Farmer, offering social commentary. Walter Lowe, the magazine's first black editor, had proposed this assignment to Baldwin. The resulting book's epigraph draws from Hebrews 11:1.

Background 
Baldwin's collection of work had made him a prominent social critic. While researching the Atlanta Child Murders, he encounters Camille Bell, the mother of a 9-year-old, named Yusef, killed in this period. Camille Bell created a Committee to Stop Children's Murders, which advocated for the affected families. According to Derrick Bell, who wrote the foreword in the book's 1995 edition, the earlier outcry had revealed the need for Baldwin to write an essay that "eschews a search for clues and, instead, undertakes an exploration for truths."[3]

Summary

Race Relations 
The investigation into the Atlanta Child Murders was overseen by then police commissioner Lee Brown. Fear was heightened around the city and people grew anxious and more concerned as time passed. Lee held several city meetings during this time period hoping to calm public fear and reinstate public trust in the police to find the murderer. Lee brought together a task force of more than 100 personnel from Atlanta's own police force and  nearby, governing  law-enforcement agencies.

During the tenure of Brown as Atlanta's police commissioner, efforts rose to diversify Atlanta's police force, which at the time was only 20% African-American officers. The same Atlanta police force in the late 1940s  hired its first African-American police officers; however, it stripped them of enforcing all laws; for instance, black officers were not allowed to arrest white people.

Baldwin remarks not only on the relationship between the African-American community and the police, but specifically, the relationship between said community and African-American police-officers. Some of Atlanta's black officers were Baldwin's guides while reporting in the city, which allowed for Baldwin to observe the officers reactions to the community's view of the black police force. Baldwin compares the relationship between the police and the community in Atlanta to that of his hometown, Harlem. In Harlem, the black officers understood the community distrusted them but Baldwin remarks that it did not matter, and compares this to Atlanta's black officers, who received the same sentiment from their own community, but Baldwin writes, "the knowledge seemed to sting."

A City Too Busy to Care 
On June 21, 1981, Wayne Williams was arrested on the murders of Nathaniel Cater and Jimmy Payne. Commencing on January 6, 1982, the trial was overseen by judge Clarence Cooper. Baldwin gives readers backstory on Cooper, and explains that the then district attorney, Lewis Slaton, both guided prosecutions and aided development of Atlanta's black legal workers. Baldwin ponders Wayne Williams's upbringing, stresses that Williams was never legally accused of 28 murders, and eventually concludes that Williams "must be added to the list of Atlanta's slaughtered black children."

Baldwin discusses that judge Cooper was born in Decatur, an Atlanta suburb, whereby Cooper could potentially say, "I'm from Atlanta. I'm not from Georgia." Baldwin mentions the original analogy about Harlem: "I'm from Harlem. I'm not from New York." Baldwin asserts the clarity of the claim while stating that both cities are not nations. Baldwin references his own personal interactions with friends in Atlanta who assume the same identity of belonging to a city outside of the nation it belongs to. Baldwin discusses how Atlanta had originated as a railroad town named Terminus. In the 1980s, Atlanta hosted one of the "world's busiest" airports. Baldwin remarks on the success of Atlanta as a commercial hub to highlight what the city placed importance on being "The City Too Busy To Hate."

Baldwin's critical analysis on the Atlanta Child Murders sparked substantial interest and intrigue surrounding the case. Many citizens began to demand reform for missing child cases in Atlanta after further supporting evidence from the murders were shared with the general public. In 1991, Journal Constitution released the composite list of names and ages of the victims. Within the two month investigative period, Wayne Williams was convicted and tried for the Atlanta Child Murders after being connected to two of the victims. Subsequently, he was immediately indicted and sentenced to life, despite his two victims being adults. However, over the years there has been significant backlash over the sole involvement of Williams. Many citizens have speculated other theories concerning the Atlanta Child Murders based on circumstantial evidence, including involvement of the KKK, convicted pedophiles, Centers for Disease Control and Prevention, and the CIA. In 2019, after a news report on the Atlanta Child Murders, a considerable amount of new evidence surfaced from testimonies that created a new wave of interest from Atlanta's mayor, Keisha Lance Bottoms.

The Committee to Stop Children's Murders 
Camille Bell was a young mother to a 9 year old boy named Yusuf Bell. Yusuf's body was found in a crawlspace in an abandoned elementary school that had been empty for over five years. When Bell contacted police about the investigation of her son's death, she was ignored. Bell and a number of mothers formed a "support group" that soon became the Committee to Stop Children's Murders. This committee sought to determine the culprit behind the Atlanta Child Murders. By the time the committee was formed in May 1980, eight children had been murdered and their killer remained at large.

Baldwin praised Bell for her extensive knowledge of the murders, but mentioned that, out of respect, he did not interview Bell. The Committee to Stop Children's Murders began collecting funds to help the parents of the murdered children continue their venture. But Georgia charged them of having "violated Georgia law as concerned charitable solicitations."

Critical reception 
In the 1985 New York Times review, John Flemming gives a brief synopsis of the Child Murders. He acknowledges Baldwin's account of the grotesque nature of not only the murders themselves, but the state of race relations in America. Flemming writes about Baldwin's sentiment where during his investigations and research he felt like a stranger in the city of Atlanta. His repeated mention of Baldwin's assessment of Wayne Williams's trial reflects a major part of his essay, where Baldwin acknowledges Williams's behavior as abnormal, but he still believed the trial to be a focus of skepticism.

In Richard Schur's review of Baldwin's work, he ties the essay's publication date in the 1980s as part of a collective effort by intellectuals and activists to criticize the National Association for the Advancement of Colored People's legal strategy in garnering freedom and equality for African-Americans. Schur canvases Baldwin's disposition concerning the failure of legal activists to realize that eradicating legal, racist doctrines were insufficient in rehabilitating the lives of African Americans. Moreover, Schur states that Baldwin believed evaluating the evidence during the Civil Rights Movement would have been more practical than eradicating racist laws, which would have been able to dissolve conditioning taking place between courts, judges and juries.

See also 

 I Am Not Your Negro, a 2016 documentary film directed by Raoul Peck, based on James Baldwin's unfinished manuscript Remember This House.

References

Further reading 

 
 
 
 Maurice J. Hobson. "3. The Sorrow of a City: Collisions in Class and Counternarratives—the Atlanta Child Murders." The Legend of the Black Mecca : Politics and Class in the Making of Modern Atlanta, The University of North Carolina Press, 2017.
 The Associated Press. "Atlanta's Mayor Pushes to Review Evidence in 'Child Murders.'" AP Regional State Report - Georgia, Associated Press DBA Press Association, 21 Mar. 2019.

External links 

 1965 James Baldwin and William F. Buckley Cambridge University Debate on Youtube

1985 non-fiction books
Books by James Baldwin
Non-fiction books about murders in the United States
Henry Holt and Company books
Non-fiction books about serial killers
Books about race and ethnicity